Alucita fumosa is a moth of the family Alucitidae. It is found on Buru.

References

Moths described in 1948
Alucitidae
Moths of Indonesia
Taxa named by Alexey Diakonoff